Perry Robins (born June 14, 1930) is Professor Emeritus of Dermatology at New York University, dermatologist, physician, Mohs surgeon, and author. Robins founded the Skin Cancer Foundation, the Journal of Drugs in Dermatology, Journal of Dermatologic Surgery & Oncology, International Society for Dermatologic Surgery, and trained in and taught the Mohs micrographic surgery (MMS) technique.

Career and education 
Perry Robins was born in Newark, New Jersey, on June 14, 1930. Robins' early education was at James Caldwell High School in West Caldwell, New Jersey, where he earned his high school diploma. In 1952, Robins earned a Bachelor of Science Degree from the University of Maryland. In 1961, Robins went on to earn his Doctorate of Medicine at Heidelberg University, Germany. From 1961 to 1962 he completed an internship at Orange Memorial Hospital in Orange, New Jersey.

From 1962 to 1964 he was a resident in dermatology and syphilology at the Bronx Veterans Administration Hospital in New York. 1990 American College of Mohs Micrographic Surgery and Cutaneous Oncology: Board Certification.

In 1978 Perry founded the Skin Cancer Foundation, a non-profit organization dedicated to advancing research, medical education, and education of the public in the prevention and early detection of cancers of the skin.

Perry was the founder and director of forum for the Advancement of Dermatologic Surgery, 1983–Present, Evening Skin Surgery Workshops, 1983–Present, Advanced Flaps & Grafts Workshops, 1984–Present, One-year training program in Mohs Micrographic Surgery, 1966–Present and founded the International Alliance Against Skin Cancer in1997.

Honors 
Perry received awards and honors throughout his career some of them are:

 Award for Excellence in Education
 14 Gold Triangle Awards for Excellence in Community Education
 Presidential Citation by the International Society of Dermatologic Surgery

Bibliography 

 Robins, Perry, and Michael Podwal. Play it safe in the sun. New York, N.Y: Skin Cancer Foundation, 1993. Print.
 Petres, Johannes, Rainer Rompel, and Perry Robins. Dermatologic Surgery: Textbook and Atlas. Berlin, Heidelberg: Springer Berlin Heidelberg, 1996. Print.
 Robins, Perry, and Maritza Perez. Understanding melanoma : what you need to know. New York: Skin Cancer Foundation, 2005. Print.
 Robins, Perry: “Mohs Chemosurgery for Tumors of the Periorbital Area,” Ocular and Adnexal Tumors (ed. F. A. Jakobiec) Aesculapius Publishing, Birmingham, 1978
Robins, Perry; Dahmane, N; Lee, L; Heller, P; Ruiz I Ataba, A: “Activation of the Transcription Factor Gli 1 and the Sonic Hedgehog Signaling Pathway in Skin Tumors,” Nature, Vol. 389, Oct. 1997

See also 

 Journal of Drugs in Dermatology
 Skin Cancer Foundation 
 Mohs surgery
 Frederic E. Mohs

References

External links 
 Journal of Drugs in Dermatology
 Skin Cancer Foundation

American dermatologists
1930 births
Living people